The 2020 Senior Bowl was an all-star college football exhibition game played on January 25, 2020, at 1:30 p.m. CST, at Ladd–Peebles Stadium in Mobile, Alabama. The game featured prospects for the 2020 draft of the professional National Football League (NFL), predominantly from the 2019 NCAA Division I FBS football season, rostered into "North" and "South" teams. It was one of the final 2019–20 bowl games concluding the 2019 FBS football season. It was sponsored by Reese's Peanut Butter Cups and was officially known as the Reese's Senior Bowl, with television coverage provided by NFL Network.

Coaching staffs for the Senior Bowl are selected from NFL teams that did not qualify for the postseason. The Detroit Lions and Cincinnati Bengals were selected to coach in 2020, led by head coaches Matt Patricia and Zac Taylor, respectively. The Lions coached the North team, while the Bengals coached the South team.

This would prove to be the last Senior Bowl played at Ladd–Peebles Stadium. On March 4, 2020, game organizers announced that future editions would remain in Mobile, but move to Hancock Whitney Stadium, set to open in fall 2020 on the campus of the University of South Alabama.

Players
Organizers maintained a "watch list" of hundreds of players, with a maximum of 110 players invited to the game. Players who accepted invitations to the game were listed on the official website, with complete rosters presented below. While team assignments for the North and South squads follow general geographical guidelines, there are usually multiple variances due to competitive and roster-balancing considerations. Players were from FBS programs, unless marked otherwise in the "College" column.

North team
Full roster online here.

South team
Full roster online here.

Quarterback Jalen Hurts was provided with a special helmet for the Senior Bowl, representing Alabama on one side and Oklahoma on the other side, the two college programs that he played for.

Game summary
Note: special playing rules detailed here.

Statistics

References

External links
 NCAAF 2020 Reese's Senior Bowl via YouTube

Senior Bowl
Senior Bowl
Senior Bowl
Senior Bowl